Louis Goldstein may refer to:

 Louis L. Goldstein, politician
 Louis M. Goldstein, linguist